The 10th Army was a World War II field army of  (Germany).

A new 10th Army was activated in 1943 as part of Adolf Hitler's last stand, who saw action notably in late 1943 and early 1944 along the "Winter Line" at the Battle of San Pietro Infine and the Battle of Monte Cassino, before finally surrendering near the Alps. Among its troops at Cassino were the XIV Panzer Corps and Parachute divisions of the Luftwaffe.

Commanders

See also 
10th Army (German Empire) for the equivalent formation in World War I

References 

 Walter Görlitz, "Reichenau," in Correlli Barnett ed., Hitler's Generals (New York: Grove Weidenfeld, 1989), pp. 208–18.

10
Military units and formations established in 1939
1939 establishments in Germany
Military units and formations disestablished in 1939
Military units and formations established in 1943
Military units and formations disestablished in 1945